Cussonia spicata, known as spiked cabbage tree, lowveld cabbage tree or common cabbage tree, is a tree in the family Araliaceae, which is native to the moister regions of Sub-Saharan Africa. It is cultivated as a garden plant in areas without extreme degrees of frost. It is one of the favorite foods of wild elephants.

Description

Larger specimens develop a sturdy trunk and a rounded, spreading canopy, and can reach a height of 15 meters. The attractive leaves grow from the end of thick branches to form rounded heads. The species name spicata means "spike-like", and suggests the arrangement of its flowers.

Range
It occurs naturally from southern and eastern South Africa to the Eastern Highlands of Zimbabwe, Mozambique, Zambia and northwards into tropical Africa.

Ethnomedical uses
It has been used in traditional African medicine and its medicinal properties are being investigated.

A bark decoction is used in the treatment of malaria, and indigestion in a similar manner to tonic water 
A root decoction is used to treat fever, venereal disease, as well as a diuretic and laxative. 
A root bark decoction is used to treat mental illness.

References

PlantZAfrica.com: Cussonia spicata
Flora of Zimbabwe: Cussonia spicata

External links

 

Araliaceae
Plants used in traditional African medicine
Trees of South Africa